Pranidipine is a calcium channel blocker. It is a long acting calcium channel antagonist of the dihydropyridine group.

References

Calcium channel blockers
Dihydropyridines
Carboxylate esters
Nitrobenzenes
Methyl esters